Pokkattadikkaari is a 1978 Indian Malayalam-language film, directed by P. G. Vishwambharan. The film stars Vincent, Sudheer and Ravikumar. The film's score was composed by A. T. Ummer.

Cast
Unnimary
Ravikumar
Sudheer
Vijayalalitha
Vincent

Soundtrack
The music was composed by A. T. Ummer with lyrics by Yusufali Kechery and Mankombu Gopalakrishnan.

References

External links
 

1978 films
1970s Malayalam-language films
Films directed by P. G. Viswambharan